Delight 
This page includes a list of biblical proper names that start with D in English transcription. Some of the names are given with a proposed etymological meaning. For further information on the names included on the list, the reader may consult the sources listed below in the References and External Links.

A – B – C – D – E – F – G – H – I – J – K – L – M – N – O – P – Q – R – S – T – U – V – Y – Z

D

Dabareh
Dabbasheth
Daberath
Dagon
Dalaiah, variant spelling of Delaiah
Dalmanutha
Dalmatia
Dalphon
Damaris
Damascus
Damien
Danaja
Dan
Daniel, God is my judge
Dannah
Dara, misspelling of Darda
Darda, a pearl of wisdom
Darius, he that informs himself of a king 
Darkon, bearer or scattering possibly related to Aramaic terms for hasten or shield
Dathan, belonging to law
David, beloved
Debir, speaker
Deborah, bee
Decapolis
Dedan, low, their friendship
Dedanim
Dekar, lance bearer, perforation
Delaiah, Jehovah is deliverer
Delilah, Samson's mistress languishing
Demas, ruler of people
Demetrius
Derbe
Deuel
Deuteronomy
Diana
Diblaim
Diblah
Diblath
Dibon
Dibon-gad
Dibri
Didymus
Diklah
Dilean,
Dimon
Dimonah
Dinah
Dinhabah
Dionysius
Diotrephes
Dishan
Dishon
Dizahab
Dodai, 
Dodavah
Dodo
Doeg
Dophkah
Dor
Dorcas
Dothan
Drusilla
Dumah
Dura

References
Comay, Joan, Who's Who in the Old Testament, Oxford University Press, 1971, 
Lockyer, Herbert, All the men of the Bible, Zondervan Publishing House (Grand Rapids, Michigan), 1958
Lockyer, Herbert, All the women of the Bible, Zondervan Publishing 1988, 
Lockyer, Herbert, All the Divine Names and Titles in the Bible, Zondervan Publishing 1988, 
Tischler, Nancy M., All things in the Bible: an encyclopedia of the biblical world , Greenwood Publishing, Westport, Conn. : 2006

Inline references
 

D